Gushac (in Albanian) or Gušavac (in Serbian: Гушавац) is a village in the municipality of Mitrovica in the District of Mitrovica, Kosovo. According to the 2011 census, it has 475 inhabitants, all Albanians.

Notes

References 

Villages in Mitrovica, Kosovo